Amanda Eunice Cheatham ( January 10, 1903 – April 10, 1978) was an American biologist. She was the first woman of color to deliver a research paper to the Virginia Academy of Science, having done so in 1939.

Early life and education

Amanda E. Peele was born on January 10, 1903, in Jackson, North Carolina. A 1923 graduate of Northampton County Training School, Peele earned a Bachelor of Science degree from Hampton Institute in 1930. After winning a fellowship from the General Education Board, she earned a Master of Science degree from Cornell University in 1934. Her thesis, entitled Floral anatomy of Trapa natans, was a study of water caltrops. At Cornell, Peele studied under Arthur Johnson Eames, William J. Hamilton, Jr., and Albert Hazen Wright.

Academic career

In 1930, Peele was hired as an assistant professor at Hampton Institute, where she taught biology until her retirement in 1972. In 1941, she served as a regional director of the National Association of College Women. In 1970, she was awarded the Christian R. and Mary F. Lindback Distinguished Teaching Award by Hampton University. She was president of the National Hampton Alumni Association from 1970-1977.

References

Hampton University faculty
American women academics
African-American educators
American women biologists
African-American scientists
Cornell University alumni
1903 births
1978 deaths
20th-century African-American women
20th-century African-American people
20th-century American people